Yar Mohammad Barakzai (born 1923) was an Afghan footballer who competed at the 1948 Summer Olympic Games.

References

1923 births
Possibly living people
Afghan men's footballers
Olympic footballers of Afghanistan
Footballers at the 1948 Summer Olympics
Association football midfielders
Footballers at the 1951 Asian Games
Asian Games competitors for Afghanistan